7 (also known as Madness 7) is the third studio album from the British ska/pop band Madness. Released in October 1981, it reached No. 5 in the UK album chart. All but one track was recorded at Compass Point Studios in Nassau, Bahamas in the summer of 1981, the exception being "Grey Day" which was recorded in London earlier in the year. Although in 2011 co-producer Alan Winstanley stated in the Guided Tour of Madness boxed-set that much of the album was re-recorded in London when they returned from Nassau.

Track listing

There were several different versions of the album released throughout the world. Some territories removed the not so tourist-friendly "Day on the Town" while others replaced it with "Never Ask Twice (a.k.a. Aeroplane/Airplane)", which was issued on the "Shut Up" 12" in the UK. In Belgium "Never Ask Twice" was issued on a one-sided 7" single with initial copies of the album. France renamed "Day on the Town" as "A Place in The City". Australia added "It Must Be Love" and "Never Ask Twice", Spain replaced "Cardiac Arrest" with "It Must Be Love" and Japan added "In the City", which was issued there as a single after it was initially written for and used to promote Honda City cars in television commercials.

Initial vinyl pressings featured different mixes of some tracks (most notably "Mrs Hutchinson" and "Day on the Town"), which haven't been used since.

2010 reissue
In 2009 and 2010, Madness re-released their entire back catalogue of studio albums up until 1999's Wonderful with a bonus CD and extra tracks. 7 was reissued by Union Square Music's collector's label Salvo on 12 April 2010.

CD 1
The original album
The first disc contains the thirteen tracks from the original album plus four promo videos.
The promo videos 
Grey Day
Shut Up
It Must be Love
Cardiac Arrest

CD 2

Personnel
Madness
 Graham "Suggs" McPherson – lead vocals
 Mike Barson – piano, organ, vibes, marimba, tubular bells
 Chris Foreman – guitar, sitar
 Mark Bedford – bass
 Lee Thompson – saxophones, burps, squeaks, lead vocals on track 10
 Daniel Woodgate – drums, congas
 Chas Smash – backing vocals, trumpet
Technical
Clive Langer – producer, engineer
Alan Winstanley – producer, engineer
Arun Chakraverty – mastering
Stella Artwork – cover
C-More – cover
Mike Putland – photography
2010 reissue
Dale Griffin – producer on Richard Skinner session 
Mike Engels – engineer on Richard Skinner session
Tim Turan – remastering 
Martin 'Cally' Callomon – art direction, design 
David Quantick – liner notes

Chart performance

Album

Singles

Certifications and sales

References

External links

Madness (band) albums
1981 albums
Stiff Records albums
Albums produced by Alan Winstanley
Albums produced by Clive Langer